Surendra Mohan Kuriakose was a judge of the Kerala High Court. The  High Court of Kerala  is the highest court in the Indian state of Kerala and in the Union Territory of Lakshadweep. The High Court of Kerala is headquartered at Ernakulam, Kochi.

Early life and education
Surendra Mohan  was born on 01.03.1957. He obtained a law degree from University College of Law, Dharwad and post graduation from School of Legal Studies, Cochin University of Science & Technology.

Career
Surendra Mohan was enrolled as Advocate on 12.10.1980 and started practice at Ernakulam. He elevated as Additional Judge of High Court of Kerala on 05.1.2009 became permanent from 15.12.2010 and retired from service on 01.03.2019.

References

Living people
Judges of the Kerala High Court
1957 births